Louis de Tribolet was a Swiss fencer. He competed in the individual and team épée events at the 1920 Summer Olympics.

References

External links
 

Year of birth missing
Year of death missing
Swiss male épée fencers
Olympic fencers of Switzerland
Fencers at the 1920 Summer Olympics